Radio Beat is a Czech radio station, broadcasting from Prague. It plays classic rock. There is thematic program every weekend. There is a program after 7:00 pm Every day. Radio Beat started broadcasting on 1 January 2002.

Programme 

Radio Beat has regular schedule every week.

Monday: 19:00 – 20:00 "Beatová klenotnice" (Beat's treasury) – "Untraditionally chart of Rock delicatessen"
Tuesday: 19:00 – 20:00 "Kalumet strýčka indiána" – Interview with interesting people
Wednesday: 19:00 – 20:00 "Uši Rádia Beat" (Ears of Radio Beat) – Moderator playing songs to his guests and they must guess Artist
Thursday: 19:00 – 20:00 "Svěženky a machři" – Programme about new bands and their ideals. Playing new and old songs
Friday: 19:00 – 22:00 "Větrník" (Weathercock) – "Talkshow" with Jaromir Tuma and Honza Hamernik
Saturday: 19:00 – 23:00 "Rocková pípa" (Rock's faucet) – Every Saturday is on Radio Beat's Garden little inn and you can go there and wish song.
Sunday: 20:00 – 0:00 "Hard & Heavy" – Programme about extreme ways in Rock music

Every Tuesday and Thursday: 23:00 – 0:00 "Půlnoční album" (Midnight album) – On web pages of Radio Beat you can choose from 6 albums and two with most votes will be all played.

100 albums in 100 days 

1. The Beatles - White Album
2. Van Halen - 5150
3. Frank Zappa - Sheik Yerbouti
4. Deep Purple - In Rock
5. Bruce Springsteen - Born in the U.S.A.
6. Joe Satriani - Crystal Planet
7. Vladimír Mišík - Strihali dohola maleho chlapecka
8. Lynyrd Skynyrd - Second Helping (Remastred)
9. David Bowie - Ziggy Stardust
10. Alice Cooper - Billion Dollar Babies
11. Yes - Close to the Edge
12. Bob Dylan - Highway 61 Revisited
13. Helloween - Keeper of the Seven Keys Part 1
14. Blue Effect - Svět hledačů
15. Def Leppard - Pyromania
16. Mike Oldfield - Tubular Bells
17. Uriah Heep - Look At Yourself
18. Talking Heads - Little Creatures
19. UFO - Lights Out
20. Creedence Clearwater Revival - Willy And The Poorboys
21. Jeff Beck - Blow by Blow
22. Katapult - 2006
23. King Crimson - In the Court of the Crimson King
24. Red Hot Chili Peppers - Blood Sugar Sex Magik
25. Fermata - Huascaran
26. Guns N' Roses - Appetite For Destruction
27. Electric Light Orchestra - A New World Record
28. Whitesnake - Whitesnake
29. Dream Theater - Metropolis Part 2
30. Bachman–Turner Overdrive - Not Fragile
31. Dire Straits - Brothers in Arms
32. Eagles - Hotel California
33. Jiří Schelinger - Hrrr... na ne
34. Janis Joplin - Pearl
35. King Diamond - Abigail
36. Midnight Oil - Diesel and Dust
37. Kiss - Dynasty
38. Lou Reed - Coney Island Baby
39. Mötley Crüe - Shout at the Devil
40. Luboš Pospíšil - Tenhle vitr jsem mel rad
41. U2 - The Joshua Tree
42. ZZ Top - Eliminator
43. Tři sestry - Na Kovarne, To Je Narez
44. Led Zeppelin - Led Zeppelin IV
45. The Clash - London Calling
46. Free - Highway
47. Genesis - The Lamb Lies Down on Broadway
48. The Who - Who's Next
49. Jethro Tull - Aqualung
50. Jimi Hendrix - Are You Experienced
51. Aerosmith - Toys in the Attic
52. Pink Floyd - The Dark Side of the Moon
53. The Guess Who - American Woman
54. The Doors - The Doors
55. Nirvana - Nevermind
56. Sex Pistols - Never Mind the Bollocks Here's the Sex Pistols
57. Black Sabbath - Paranoid
58. Simon and Garfunkel - Bridge Over Troubled Water
59. AC/DC - Back in Black
60. The Police - Synchronicity
61. Metallica - Metallica
62. The Byrds - Mr. Tambourine Man
63. Green Day - American Idiot
64. Collegium Musicum - Konvergencie
65. Motörhead - Ace of Spades
66. Focus - Mowing Waves
67. Krausberry - Na větvi
68. Pearl Jam - Ten
69. Supertramp - Breakfast In America
70. Thin Lizzy - Jailbreak
71. Eric Clapton -Slowhand
72. Gary Moore - Still Got the Blues
73. Iron Maiden - The Number Of The Beast
74. Marillion - Misplaced Childhood
75. Framus Five - Kolej Yesterday
76. Nazareth - Razamanaz
77. Manowar - Fighting The World
78. Neil Young - Harvest
79. Judas Priest - British Steel
80. Omega - 10 000 lépés
81. Ozzy Osbourne - Ozzmosis
82. Peter Gabriel - So
83. Queen - A Night at the Opera
84. Rainbow - Rising
85. Rolling Stones - Sticky Fingers
86. Rush - Moving Pictures
87. Santana - Abraxas
88. Scorpions - Crazy World
89. Slade - Slade Alive!
90. Ten Years After - Stonedhenge
91. Visací zámek - Start 02
92. Accept - Metal Heart
93. Bad Company - Bad Company
94. Crosby, Stills, Nash & Young - Déjà Vu
95. Emerson, Lake & Palmer - Tarkus
96. Grand Funk Railroad - We're an American Band
97. Patti Smith - Horses
98. The Plastic People of the Universe - Hovězí porážka
99. Queensrÿche - Operation Mindcrime
100. Progres 2 - Dialog s vesmírem

Official site of Radio Beat 

Radio stations in the Czech Republic
Radio stations established in 2002